Alexander Bogdanovich Karlin, born 29 October 1951 in the selo of Medvedka, located in the Tyumentsevsky District of Altai Krai, is a Russian politician. He served as the Governor of Altai Krai from 2005 until 2018.

He became Head of Altai Krai in 2005, replacing Mikhail Kozlov, who assumed the post of acting head after the death of Mikhail Yevdokimov. In December 2007, the administration changed the title of the position to the Governor of Altai Krai. In July 2014, he resigned from his post, but was immediately appointed as the acting governor and ran in the September 2014 elections. In the election, he took 73% of the vote, defeating Sergey Yurchenko, who managed on 11%.

On August 13, 2010, Alexander Karlin made a controversial decision to fire mayor of Barnaul who was legitimately elected in 2008.

On May 30, 2018, Karlin resigned as Governor with immediate effect.

References

1951 births
Living people
People from Altai Krai
United Russia politicians
21st-century Russian politicians
1st class Active State Councillors of the Russian Federation
Governors of Altai Krai
Heads of the federal subjects of Russia of German descent
Members of the Federation Council of Russia (after 2000)
Ural State Law University alumni